Lester B. Pearson International Airport , commonly known as Toronto Pearson International Airport, is an international airport located in Mississauga, Ontario, Canada. It is the main airport serving Toronto, its metropolitan area, and the surrounding region known as the Golden Horseshoe. The airport is named in honour of Lester B. Pearson, who served as the 14th Prime minister of Canada and received the Nobel Peace Prize in 1957.

It is the largest and busiest airport in Canada, handling 50.5 million passengers in 2019. As of 2019, it was the second-busiest international air passenger gateway in the Americas (behind John F. Kennedy International Airport) and the 30th-busiest airport in the world by passenger traffic.

Toronto Pearson is the primary hub for Air Canada. It also serves as a hub for WestJet, cargo airline FedEx Express, and as a base of operations for Air Transat and Sunwing Airlines. Toronto Pearson is operated by the Greater Toronto Airports Authority (GTAA) as part of Transport Canada's National Airports System, and is the largest airport in the world with facilities for United States border preclearance.

An extensive network of non-stop domestic flights is operated from Toronto Pearson by several airlines to all major and many secondary cities across all provinces and territories of Canada. Since 2014, over 75 airlines operated around 1,250 daily departures from the airport to more than 180 destinations across five continents.

History

In 1937, the Government of Canada agreed to support the building of two airports in the Toronto area. One site selected was on the Toronto Islands, which is the present-day Billy Bishop Toronto City Airport. The other site selected was an area northwest of Toronto near the town of Malton in what was then Toronto Township (which would later become Mississauga to avoid confusion with the nearby city of Toronto), which was originally intended to serve as an alternate to the downtown airport but instead would become its successor. The first scheduled passenger flight at the Malton Airport was a Trans-Canada Air Lines DC-3 that landed on August 29, 1939. Since Toronto has more than one airport, YTO is used for the area designation, while Pearson is coded YYZ, Billy Bishop Toronto City Airport is YTZ and Toronto/Buttonville Municipal Airport is YKZ. YZ was the code for the station in Malton, Ontario, where Pearson Airport is located and hence the IATA code for Pearson Airport is YYZ. The telegraph station in Toronto itself was coded TZ, which is why Toronto's smaller Billy Bishop Airport is coded YTZ.

During World War II, the Royal Canadian Air Force established a base at the airport as a component of the British Commonwealth Air Training Plan. RCAF Station Malton was home to several training schools and was in operation between 1940 and 1946.

In 1958, the municipal government of Toronto sold the Malton Airport to the Government of Canada, which subsequently changed the name of the facility to Toronto International Airport, under the management of Transport Canada. The airport was officially renamed Lester B. Pearson International Airport in 1984, in honour of Toronto-born Lester B. Pearson, the 14th prime minister of Canada and recipient of the 1957 Nobel Peace Prize. The Greater Toronto Airports Authority (GTAA) assumed management, operation, and control of the airport in 1996, and has used the name Toronto Pearson International Airport for the facility since the transition.

Terminals
Toronto Pearson International Airport has two active public terminals, Terminal 1 and Terminal 3. Both terminals are designed to handle all three sectors of travel (domestic, transborder, and international), which results in terminal operations at Toronto Pearson being grouped for airlines and airline alliances, rather than for domestic and international routes.

A third public terminal, the Infield Concourse (IFC), currently acts as an extension of Terminal 3 providing additional bridged gates.

Terminal 2 was permanently closed and demolished in 2007, replaced by an expanded Terminal 1. Terminal 3 retains its numbering to prevent confusion.

Terminal 1
The current Terminal 1 first opened in 2004, replacing Aeroquay One and Terminal 2. Air Canada and all other Star Alliance airlines that serve Pearson Airport are based at Terminal 1. Other airlines that use this terminal include Air North, Canadian North, Emirates, Eurowings Discover, and Lynx Air. Sunwing Airlines previously had its base at Terminal 1 until it moved to Terminal 3 on 1 May 2016. 

Terminal 1 was designed by a joint venture known as Airports Architects Canada made up of Skidmore, Owings & Merrill, Adamson Associates Architects and Moshe Safdie and Associates. It contains 58 gates, with two of them being able to accommodate the Airbus A380.

Along with the standard customs and immigration facilities, Terminal 1 also contains special customs "B" checkpoints along the international arrivals walkway. Passengers connecting from an international or trans-border arrival to another international (non-U.S.) departure in Terminal 1 go to one of these checkpoints for passport control and immigration checks, then are immediately directed to Pier E for departure. This alleviates the need to recheck bags, pass through security screening, and relieves congestion in the primary customs hall. International-to-domestic passengers use the same corridor and a bus for one-stop security procedures, which avoids having to re-clear security if coming from another country with a mutual agreement.

The terminal has a total of eight lounges, with five of the lounges being Air Canada operated lounges (three Maple Leaf Lounges, one Maple Leaf Express Lounge and one Signature Suite) and three being Plaza Premium operated. Both Air Canada and Plaza Premium have lounges in the Domestic, International and Transborder zones, with the Signature Suite being in the International Zone.

In addition to the eight lounges, Air Canada operates the Air Canada Cafe, in which premium passengers have the ability to enter into the zone and get premium coffee, tea and grab-and-go snacks.

In the domestic section of the arrivals level, there are some retailers, such as 7-Eleven, which was renovated in late 2022.

Terminal 1 is home to the ThyssenKrupp Express Walkway, the world's fastest moving walkway.

Terminal 3

The current Terminal 3 opened in 1991. The building is a  facility designed by B+H Architects and Scott Associates Architects Inc.

Originally, Terminal 3 was the base of operations for Canadian Airlines International (defunct since 2001). Today, the terminal is the Toronto hub for WestJet, which is unaffiliated with any airline alliance and is also used by all SkyTeam and Oneworld airlines that serve Pearson Airport, along with Air Transat, Biman Bangladesh Airlines, Canada Jetlines, Etihad Airways, Pakistan International Airlines, Philippine Airlines, Porter Airlines, Sunwing Airlines and all other airlines that are unaffiliated with an airline alliance (Air North, Canadian North,  Emirates, Eurowings Discover and Lynx Air are the only airlines that are unaffiliated with an airline alliance use Terminal 1). Terminal 3 has 46 gates.

A five-level parking garage with 3,800 public parking spaces (including 600 rental car spaces)  is located directly across from the terminal along with the Sheraton Hotel, both of which are connected to Terminal 3 by an elevated pedestrian walkway.

Since June 2018, the GTAA has used the Infield Terminal to act as an extension of Terminal 3 to provide additional bridged gates. Passengers on flights arriving or departing from gates at the Infield Terminal are transported by bus to/from Terminal 3.

American Airlines has an Admirals Club in the US Pre-clearance departures area.

Infield Concourse
The Infield Concourse (IFC) was originally built to handle traffic displaced during the development and construction of the current Terminal 1.  Its 11 gates were opened gradually throughout 2002 and 2003, and a business lounge was opened in 2005. In 2009, the Infield Concourse was closed for regular operations in conjunction with the official opening of the newly constructed Terminal 1. However, the GTAA retained plans to reactivate the IFC for regular operations whenever necessary to accommodate seasonal or overflow demand.

The terminal was substantially renovated in late 2015 to serve as a dedicated terminal for incoming government-sponsored refugees of the Syrian Civil War. Further renovations were completed at the Infield Concourse in early 2018 and on June 5, 2018, the terminal was reactivated for summer operations by the GTAA to act as an extension of Terminal 3 with the purpose of providing required additional bridged gates. Passengers are transported by bus between Terminal 3 and the IFC. Effective December 2019, Sunwing Airlines moved their operations from Terminal 3 to the IFC.

Due to its intermittent usage for passenger traffic, the Infield Concourse is frequently used as a location to film major motion pictures and television productions.

VIP Terminal
Skyservice FBO operates an  private VIP terminal at Toronto Pearson on Midfield Road in the infield area of the airport. The terminal handles most private aircraft arriving and departing at Pearson, providing passenger services that include a 24/7 concierge, private customs and immigration facilities, personalized catering, showers, direct handling of baggage, and VIP ground transportation services.

Infrastructure and operations

Runways

Toronto Pearson has five runways, three of which are aligned in the east–west direction, and two in the north–south direction.

Airfield operations

Toronto Pearson is home to the Toronto Area Control Centre, one of seven area control centres in Canada operated by Nav Canada. The airport uses a Traffic Management Unit (TMU), located in the apron control tower at Terminal 1, to control the movement of aircraft and other airport traffic on the ground. The main air traffic control tower at Pearson is located within the infield operations area of the airport.

The airfield maintenance unit is responsible for general maintenance and repairs at Pearson. During the winter months, the unit expands into a dedicated 24-hour snow removal team of more than 200 workers tasked with ensuring normal operations at the airport, as Pearson regularly experiences  of total snow accumulation in a typical winter season.  The airport employs over 94 pieces of snow removal equipment, including 11 Vammas PSB series, 4 Oshkosh Corporation Snow Products HT-Series snowplow units, and 14 snowmelters.

Pearson Airport's Central De-icing Facility is the largest in the world, servicing over 10,500 aircraft each winter.

The Greater Toronto Airports Authority (GTAA) Fire and Emergency Service maintains three stations at the airport, with more than 80 firefighters providing fire and rescue operations at Pearson. They are equipped with six crash tenders as well as several pumpers, aerial ladders, and heavy rescue units. The GTAA Fire and Emergency Service operates in conjunction with the Fire and Emergency Services Training Institute (FESTI), located at the northwest end of the airport grounds.

Cargo facilities

Toronto Pearson handles approximately half of all the international air cargo in Canada. The airport has three main cargo facilities, known as Cargo West (Infield), Cargo East (VISTA), and Cargo North (FedEx).

The Cargo West facility (also known as the Infield Cargo Area) is located between runways 15L/33R and 15R/33L. A four-lane vehicle tunnel connects the Infield Cargo Area to the passenger terminal area of the airport.

The Cargo East facility (also known as the VISTA cargo area) is located north of Terminal 3.

The Cargo North facility is the Canadian hub for FedEx Express.

Security
The Peel Regional Police is the primary law enforcement agency at Pearson Airport. The Royal Canadian Mounted Police (RCMP) also maintain a Toronto Airport Detachment at Pearson Airport, which provides federal law enforcement services.

The Canadian Air Transport Security Authority (CATSA) is responsible for security screening procedures at Pearson Airport. Other government agencies with security operations at Pearson include the Canada Border Services Agency (CBSA), Immigration, Refugees and Citizenship Canada (IRCC), the Canadian Security Intelligence Service (CSIS),  and Transport Canada. In addition, U.S. Customs and Border Protection (CBP) and United States Citizenship and Immigration Services (USCIS) also conduct operations at the airport to facilitate United States border preclearance.

Other facilities
Pearson Airport has seven aircraft maintenance hangars, operated by Air Canada, Air Transat, WestJet, and the GTAA, which are used for line maintenance and routine aircraft inspections. At the north end of the airfield are numerous independently operated hangars for charter aircraft and personal private aircraft based at Pearson Airport, along with passenger and maintenance facilities to service them.

The Greater Toronto Airports Authority maintains administrative offices on Convair Drive, near the southeast corner of the airfield. Gate Gourmet and CLS Catering Services both operate dedicated flight kitchen facilities at Pearson Airport for airline catering services. Aviation fuel is supplied by Esso Avitat (Jet A-1) and Shell Aerocentre (Jet A and A-1), both located in the infield operations area of the airport.

Airlines and destinations

Passenger

Notes

Cargo

Ground transportation

Train

Union Pearson Express
Trains depart every 15 minutes from Toronto Pearson Terminal 1 station and provide a 25-minute travel time to Union Station, the busiest intermodal transportation facility in Canada. Union Station offers connections to numerous GO Transit regional rail and bus services as well as inter-city rail links on Via Rail's Québec City–Windsor Corridor. Combined UP Express and inter-city tickets may be purchased from VIA Rail. The UP Express operates daily between 5:27 am and 12:57 am of the next day.

Terminal Link
The Terminal Link is an automated people mover that facilitates inter-terminal transportation at Pearson Airport. It runs between Terminal 1, Terminal 3, and the Viscount Value Park Lot, connecting to the airport terminals at Toronto Pearson Terminal 1 station and Toronto Pearson Terminal 3 station. The Terminal Link train operates daily, 24-hour service with trains departing all stations every 4 to 8 minutes.

Bus

Public transit

Several public transit bus services operate bus routes to Toronto Pearson International Airport. Additionally, route 900 Airport Express buses have a unique airport-themed livery and luggage racks. The TTC Blue Night Network operates local night bus routes to Warden Avenue in Toronto's east end via Bloor Street and Danforth Avenue, Eglinton station via Eglinton Avenue and Sunnybrook Hospital. Although the airport terminals are situated outside of the Toronto city limits, TTC bus services at Pearson Airport do not require a supplementary fare. TTC buses serve both Terminal 1 and Terminal 3.

Two public transit operators based in Peel Region also operate routes to the airport: Brampton Transit, and MiWay. Brampton Transit operates all-day public transit bus service from Pearson Airport to the city of Brampton, with express service operating to Bramalea Terminal. Brampton Transit buses arrive and depart from Terminal 1. MiWay operates all-day public transit bus service from Pearson Airport to the city of Mississauga, with express service to City Centre Transit Terminal, Humber College, and Winston Churchill Transitway Station, and local routes to Westwood Square Terminal, Renforth station, and Meadowvale Town Centre Terminal. MiWay buses arrive and depart from Terminal 1, Terminal 3, Toronto Pearson Viscount station, and the infield operations area of the airport.

GO Transit is another daily, 24-hours public transit service that operates coaches from the airport to cities across the Greater Toronto Area with express service to Richmond Hill Terminal and Hamilton GO Centre, and local service to Finch Terminal. GO Transit coaches arrive and depart from Terminal 1.

Private
The airport is served by several long-distance coach, van and minibus shuttle operators, which provide transportation from the airport to various municipalities and regional airports throughout Southern Ontario and to select cities and towns in the U.S. states of New York and Michigan.

Coach Canada's Megabus service provides bus service between Pearson Airport and Hamilton International Airport as well as between Pearson Airport and destinations east of Toronto, such as Port Hope, Trenton, Belleville, Napanee, Kingston, and Cornwall.

Car

Toronto Pearson is directly accessible from Highway 427 and Highway 409 with Airport Road and Dixon Road providing local access to the airport. There are 12,200 parking spaces available in parking garages adjacent to Terminal 1 and Terminal 3, in addition to several other parking lots located in the immediate area.

Car rentals are available from various major car rental agencies located in the parking garages adjacent to both terminals. Car rentals are also available from off-airport car rental agencies located near Toronto Pearson Viscount station, accessible from both terminals via the Link Train.

Taxi
Taxicabs and limousines can be accessed at designated taxi stands located outside of both Terminal 1 and Terminal 3. Only official airport-licensed taxis and limousines can legally pick up passengers at Toronto Pearson, and all airport-licensed taxi and limo companies use GTAA authorized flat rate fares for travel from the airport.

Rideshare
Ridesharing services Uber and Lyft are available at Pearson Airport. Designated rideshare pickup zones are located at both Terminal 1 and Terminal 3. Terminal 1 pickup is from the ground level, while Terminal 3 pickup is from the arrivals level.

Future 
In February 2017, the GTAA announced a proposed transit hub to be located across from Terminal 3 that would connect with Union Pearson Express and may connect with other transit lines extended to the airport like Line 5 Eglinton LRT and GO Transit Regional Express Rail. This proposal would eliminate the Link Train connecting Terminals 1 and 3 with a bridge from the transit hub to Terminal 3 and another bridge connecting Terminal 3 to Terminal 1.

Metrolinx is currently planning the Eglinton Crosstown West Extension, which is a western extension of the under-construction Line 5 Eglinton to a proposed transit hub at Pearson Airport across the terminals at the site of Viscount Station. The extension is scheduled to open in 2030–31. As of 2020, the segment to Pearson is under study by Metrolinx and the GTAA. The line will connect the airport to Midtown Toronto and Scarborough with additional transfers to Downtown Toronto. Metrolinx is also studying a potential connection with Line 6 Finch West to the transit hub with additional transfers to York University and Vaughan Metropolitan Centre. Other connections like the Mississauga Transitway are being studied.

Statistics

Annual traffic 

Notes
 : For operational and statistical purposes, a distinction is made between "transborder" and "international" flights at Toronto Pearson and at any other airport in Canada with United States border preclearance. A "transborder" flight is a flight between Canada and a destination in the United States, while an "international" flight is a flight between Canada and a destination that is not within the United States or Canada, and a "domestic" flight is defined as a flight within the Canadian territories only.

Incidents and accidents

 The airport's deadliest accident occurred on July 5, 1970, when Air Canada Flight 621, a DC-8 jet, flew on a Montreal–Toronto–Los Angeles route. The pilots inadvertently deployed spoilers before the plane attempted landing, forcing the pilots to abort landing and takeoff. Damage to the aircraft that was caused during the failed landing attempt caused the plane to break up in the air during the go-around, killing all 100 passengers and nine crew members on board when it crashed into a field southeast of Brampton. Controversy remains over the cleanup effort following the crash, as both plane wreckage debris and human remains from the crash are still found on the site.
 On June 26, 1978, Air Canada Flight 189 to Winnipeg overran the runway during an aborted takeoff, and crashed into the Etobicoke Creek ravine. Two of the 107 occupants on board the DC-9 were killed.
 On July 9, 1981, a KF Cargo Howard 500, pitched nose up after takeoff, stalled and crashed due to improper loading of parcels, exceeding the center of gravity. All three crew were killed.
 On January 11, 1983, a Sun Oil Co. North American Sabreliner crashed approximately 8 miles from runway 24R on an ILS approach to YYZ after descending steeply from the clouds and losing control, before crashing to the ground. All two crew and three passengers died. Cause unknown.
 On June 22, 1983, Douglas C-47A C-GUBT of Skycraft Air Transport crashed on takeoff roll at Toronto International Airport while on an international cargo flight from Cleveland Hopkins International Airport in northeastern Ohio. Both of the crew members were killed.
 On September 2, 1995, a RAF Hawker Siddeley Nimrod performing in an airshow originating in and out of YYZ crashed 1/2 mile south of Billy Bishop Toronto City Airport after a maneuver caused the aircraft to stall and crash into Lake Ontario. All seven occupants perished.
 On August 2, 2005, Air France Flight 358, an Airbus A340-300 (registration F-GLZQ) inbound from Paris, landed on runway 24L during a severe thunderstorm, failed to stop, and ran off of the runway into the Etobicoke Creek ravine. It came to a stop next to busy Highway 401. In the ensuing fire, there were 12 serious injuries, but no fatalities. The investigation predominantly blamed pilot error when faced with the severe weather conditions.
 On July 25, 2014, Sunwing Airlines Flight 772, which had taken off from Toronto bound for Scarlett Martínez International Airport, was forced to return to Toronto after a passenger made a bomb threat; the plane was escorted back to Toronto by US Air Force planes. After it landed safely, the passenger was arrested and underwent a mental examination.
 On May 10, 2019, Air Canada Flight 8615, a Bombardier DHC-8-300 (registration C-FJXZ), was struck by a fuel truck while taxiing on the tarmac. Five persons were injured and the plane was deemed a write-off.

See also 

 List of airports in Ontario
 CFBN, former radio station operated by the airport that provided travel information
 History of Toronto Pearson International Airport
 List of airports in the Greater Toronto Area
 List of international airports by country
 World's busiest airports by cargo traffic
 World's busiest airports by international passenger traffic
 World's busiest airports by passenger traffic
 World's busiest airports by traffic movements

References

External links

 
 
 Malton: Farms to Flying Book by Kathleen A. Hicks – PDF

 Toronto Pearson airport travel data at Airportsdata.net

 
Certified airports in Ontario
Buildings and structures in Mississauga
Transport in Mississauga
Transport in Toronto
Canadian airports with United States border preclearance
1938 establishments in Ontario
Airports established in 1938
National Airports System
Royal Canadian Air Force stations
Military airbases in Ontario
Airports of the British Commonwealth Air Training Plan
Military history of Ontario
Lester B. Pearson